Austin Express Inc. was a commuter airline headquartered in Austin, Texas, United States. The airline incorporated on August 13, 1997. It was originally managed by ten former Conquest Airlines executives. All of the owners and key personnel of Austin Express were formerly employed by Conquest which had also been based in Austin. Bradfield Martino, Austin was the first ad agency to advertise the airline and a New York Times article stated that the resulting ad account billings were estimated at over one million dollars. Its operations began on January 5, 1998, with a small fleet of Fairchild Swearingen Metro III propjets.

The airline operated out of Robert Mueller Municipal Airport before moving all operations to Austin Bergstrom International Airport following the closure of Mueller. The cover of the March 18, 2000 Austin Express system timetable stated the airline was offering daily flights between the Texas cities of Austin (AUS), Beaumont/Port Arthur (BPT) and Tyler (TYR).  The airline ended scheduled passenger flights on Sunday, December 31, 2000, and then became a charter air carrier.

See also 
 List of defunct airlines of the United States

References

External links
 Austin Express (Archive)

Companies based in Austin, Texas
Defunct airlines of the United States
Airlines established in 1997
Airlines disestablished in 2000
Airlines based in Texas